Samsung Galaxy C7 is an Android smartphone developed by Samsung Electronics. It was announced in May 2016 and was released in June of the same year. The phone has 32GB (expandable up to 128GB) of internal storage, 4GB of RAM, and an Octa-core 2.0 GHz Cortex-A53 CPU.

Specifications

Software 
Samsung Galaxy C7 came with Android 6.0.1 Marshmallow, but was upgradable to Android 7.0 Nougat.

Hardware 
The Samsung Galaxy C7 has 32GB (expandable up to 128GB) of internal storage and 4GB of RAM. A microSD card can be inserted for up to an additional 256GB of storage. The rear facing camera has a resolution of 16 MP, while the front facing camera is 8 MP. The phone has an Octa-core 2.0 GHz Cortex-A53 CPU and an Adreno 506 GPU. The phone is also equipped with a fingerprint scanner.

History 
The Samsung Galaxy was announced in May, 2016 and was released a month later in June.

See also 
Samsung
Samsung Electronics
Samsung Galaxy
Android

References 

Samsung Galaxy
Mobile phones introduced in 2015
Android (operating system) devices
Samsung mobile phones
Discontinued smartphones